Connecticut's 25th House of Representatives district elects one member of the Connecticut House of Representatives. It encompasses parts of the city of New Britain. It has been represented by Democrat Bobby Sanchez since 2011.

Recent elections

2020

2018

2016

2014

2012

References

25